The 1999 NASCAR Craftsman Truck Series was the fifth season of the Craftsman Truck Series, the third highest stock car racing series sanctioned by NASCAR in the United States. Jack Sprague of Hendrick Motorsports was crowned champion.

Teams and drivers 
List of full-time teams at the start of 1999.

Races

Florida Dodge Dealers 400K 

The Florida Dodge Dealers 400K was held March 20 at Homestead-Miami Speedway. Randy Tolsma won the pole.

Top Ten Results

2-Mike Wallace
66-Mike Stefanik
86-Stacy Compton
16-Ron Hornaday Jr.
60-Andy Houston
31-Kevin Cywinski
52-Scott Hansen
14-Rick Crawford
18-Butch Miller
6-Rick Carelli

Failed to qualify: none

Chevy Trucks NASCAR 150 

The Chevy Trucks NASCAR 150 was held March 27 at Phoenix International Raceway. Jack Sprague won the pole.

Top Ten Results

16-Ron Hornaday Jr.
24-Jack Sprague
60-Andy Houston
86-Stacy Compton
1-Dennis Setzer
14-Rick Crawford
43-Jimmy Hensley
3-Jay Sauter
31-Kevin Cywinski
99-Mike Bliss

Failed to qualify: none

NAPACARD 200 

The NAPACARD 200 was held April 3 at Evergreen Speedway. Ron Hornaday Jr. won the pole.

Top Ten Results

16-Ron Hornaday Jr.
24-Jack Sprague
55-Ron Barfield Jr.
86-Stacy Compton
2-Mike Wallace
6-Rick Carelli
1-Dennis Setzer
99-Mike Bliss
98-Kevin Harvick
50-Greg Biffle

Failed to qualify: none

Dodge California Truckstop 300 

The Dodge California Truckstop 300 was held April 10 at Mesa Marin Raceway. Stacy Compton won the pole.

Top Ten Results

6-Rick Carelli
98-Kevin Harvick
86-Stacy Compton
16-Ron Hornaday Jr.
43-Jimmy Hensley
1-Dennis Setzer
24-Jack Sprague
2-Mike Wallace
18-Butch Miller
31-Kevin Cywinski

Failed to qualify: Larry Carnes (#36)

NAPA 250 

The NAPA 250 was held April 17 at Martinsville Speedway. Mike Bliss won the pole.

Top Ten Results

43-Jimmy Hensley
86-Stacy Compton
24-Jack Sprague
31-Kevin Cywinski
50-Greg Biffle
99-Mike Bliss
25-Randy Tolsma
44-Ernie Irvan
6-Rick Carelli
98-Kevin Harvick

Failed to qualify: Ronnie Newman (#82), Carl Long (#91), Brian Sockwell (#54), Ronnie Hornaday (#97), Billy Venturini (#35), Ronnie Hoover (#28), Ryan McGlynn (#00), Shane Jenkins (#81)

Memphis 200 

The Memphis 200 was held May 8 at Memphis Motorsports Park. Greg Biffle won the pole. Rick Carelli suffered near-fatal injuries in a lap 12 crash during this race.

Top Ten Results

50-Greg Biffle
98-Kevin Harvick
3-Jay Sauter
86-Stacy Compton
1-Dennis Setzer
16-Ron Hornaday Jr.
60-Andy Houston
25-Randy Tolsma
24-Jack Sprague
18-Butch Miller

Failed to qualify: Billy Venturini (#35), Michael Dokken (#64), Shane Jenkins (#81)

NAPA 300K 

The NAPA 300K was held May 16 at Pikes Peak International Raceway. Mike Bliss won the pole.

Top Ten Results

2-Mike Wallace
24-Jack Sprague
98-Kevin Harvick
60-Andy Houston
43-Jimmy Hensley
16-Ron Hornaday Jr.
55-Ron Barfield Jr.
14-Rick Crawford
3-Jay Sauter
18-Butch Miller

Failed to qualify: none

O'Reilly Auto Parts 200 

The O'Reilly Auto Parts 200 was held May 22 at I-70 Speedway. Stacy Compton won the pole. This was also the first start for Jamie McMurray in the NASCAR Craftsman Truck Series

Top Ten Results

24-Jack Sprague
1-Dennis Setzer
60-Andy Houston
86-Stacy Compton
43-Jimmy Hensley
31-Kevin Cywinski
66-Mike Stefanik
25-Randy Tolsma
99-Mike Bliss
50-Greg Biffle

Failed to qualify: none

Coca-Cola Family 200 

The Coca-Cola Family 200 was held June 5 at Bristol Motor Speedway. Greg Biffle won the pole.

Top Ten Results

24-Jack Sprague
86-Stacy Compton
31-Kevin Cywinski
60-Andy Houston
1-Dennis Setzer
98-Kevin Harvick
3-Jay Sauter
27-Lonnie Rush Jr.
50-Greg Biffle
52-Scott Hanson

Failed to qualify: none

Pronto Auto Parts 400K 

The Pronto Auto Parts 400K was held June 11 at Texas Motor Speedway. Jay Sauter won the pole.

Top Ten Results

1-Dennis Setzer
3-Jay Sauter
50-Greg Biffle
2-Mike Wallace
24-Jack Sprague
99-Mike Bliss
60-Andy Houston
43-Jimmy Hensley
86-Stacy Compton
16-Ron Hornaday Jr.

Failed to qualify: Randy Renfrow (#6)

Grainger 225 

The inaugural Grainger 225 was held June 18 at Portland International Raceway. Boris Said won the pole.

Top Ten Results

50-Greg Biffle
99-Mike Bliss
87-Ron Fellows
88-Terry Cook
44-Boris Said
25-Randy Tolsma
60-Andy Houston
3-Jay Sauter
1-Dennis Setzer
18-Joe Ruttman

Failed to qualify: none

Bully Hill Vineyards 150 

The Bully Hill Vineyards 150 was held June 26 at Watkins Glen International. Ron Fellows won the pole. Ron Fellows Led most of the laps to win.

Top Ten Results

87-Ron Fellows
2-Mike Wallace
24-Jack Sprague
50-Greg Biffle
16-Ron Hornaday Jr.
3-Jay Sauter
98-Kevin Harvick
60-Andy Houston
90-Lance Norick
14-Rick Crawford

Failed to qualify: none

DieHard 200 

The DieHard 200 was held July 3 at The Milwaukee Mile. Greg Biffle won the pole.

Top Ten Results

50-Greg Biffle
24-Jack Sprague
14-Rick Crawford
2-Mike Wallace
99-Mike Bliss
1-Dennis Setzer
16-Ron Hornaday Jr.
25-Randy Tolsma
3-Jay Sauter
86-Stacy Compton

Failed to qualify: none

Federated Auto Parts 250 

The Federated Auto Parts 250 was held July 10 at Nashville Speedway USA. Tim Steele won the pole.

Top Ten Results

1-Dennis Setzer
98-Kevin Harvick
43-Jimmy Hensley
18-Joe Ruttman
24-Jack Sprague
60-Andy Houston
55-Ron Barfield Jr.
66-Mike Stefanik
21-Tim Steele
31-Kevin Cywinski

Failed to qualify: B. A. Wilson (#85), Ronnie Newman (#82), Scotty Sands (#47), Steve Stevenson (#11)

NAPA AutoCare 200 

The NAPA AutoCare 200 was held July 18 at Nazareth Speedway. Greg Biffle won the pole.

Top Ten Results

50-Greg Biffle
99-Mike Bliss
52-Scott Hansen
3-Jay Sauter
25-Randy Tolsma
75-Marty Houston
1-Dennis Setzer
66-Mike Stefanik
43-Jimmy Hensley
86-Stacy Compton

Failed to qualify: none

goracing.com 200 

The inaugural goracing.com 200 was held July 24 at Michigan International Speedway. Stacy Compton won the pole.

Top Ten Results

50-Greg Biffle
3-Jay Sauter
43-Jimmy Hensley
24-Jack Sprague
18-Joe Ruttman
86-Stacy Compton
66-Mike Stefanik
1-Dennis Setzer
16-Ron Hornaday Jr.
8-Jim Sauter

Failed to qualify: none

Pennzoil/VIP Discount Auto Center 200 

The Pennzoil/VIP Discount Auto Center 200 was held August 1 at New Hampshire International Speedway.

Top Ten Results

1-Dennis Setzer
2-Mike Wallace
86-Stacy Compton
50-Greg Biffle
14-Rick Crawford
99-Mike Bliss
60-Andy Houston
24-Jack Sprague
43-Jimmy Hensley
25-Randy Tolsma

Failed to qualify: none

Power Stroke 200 by Ford 

The Power Stroke 200 by Ford was held August 5 at Indianapolis Raceway Park. Dennis Setzer won the pole.

Top Ten Results

50-Greg Biffle
86-Stacy Compton
2-Mike Wallace
98-Kevin Harvick
99-Mike Bliss
3-Jay Sauter
1-Dennis Setzer
60-Andy Houston
25-Randy Tolsma
18-Joe Ruttman

Failed to qualify: Andy Hillenburg (#48), Kevin Sasser (#65), Mike Clark (#38), Tom Bambard (#17), Brad Means (#92)

Ram Tough 200 

The Ram Tough 200 was held August 20 at Gateway International Raceway. Stacy Compton won the pole.

Top Ten Results

50-Greg Biffle
1-Dennis Setzer
24-Jack Sprague
86-Stacy Compton
2-Mike Wallace
66-Mike Stefanik
18-Joe Ruttman
99-Mike Bliss
14-Rick Crawford
43-Jimmy Hensley

Failed to qualify: Ross Thompson (#94), Chris Horn (#58), Steve Stevenson (#11)

O'Reilly Auto Parts 275 

The O'Reilly Auto Parts 275 was held August 28 at Heartland Park Topeka. Boris Said won the pole.

Top Ten Results

99-Mike Bliss
44-Boris Said
3-Jay Sauter
14-Rick Crawford
46-Rob Morgan
16-Ron Hornaday Jr.
18-Joe Ruttman
50-Greg Biffle
2-Mike Wallace
66-Mike Stefanik

Failed to qualify: Randy Briggs (#53), Bow Carpenter (#37)

Virginia Is For Lovers 200 

The Virginia Is For Lovers 200 was held September 9 at Richmond International Raceway. Bobby Hamilton won the pole.

Top Ten Results

50-Greg Biffle
16-Ron Hornaday Jr.
1-Dennis Setzer
2-Mike Wallace
24-Jack Sprague
60-Andy Houston
45-Rich Bickle
25-Randy Tolsma
41-Randy Renfrow
34-Adam Petty

Failed to qualify: Brian Sockwell (#54), Boris Said (#44), B. A. Wilson (#85), Jerry Kobza (#11)

Orleans 250 

The Orleans 250 was held September 24 at Las Vegas Motor Speedway. Stacy Compton won the pole. Greg Biffle was penalized 120 points after the race for an illegal intake manifold on his truck. 

Top Ten Results

50-Greg Biffle
24-Jack Sprague
16-Ron Hornaday Jr.
1-Dennis Setzer
3-Jay Sauter
86-Stacy Compton
43-Jimmy Hensley
14-Rick Crawford
98-Kevin Harvick
88-Terry Cook

Failed to qualify: Auggie Vidovich (#5), Tommy Croft (#71), Bobby Register (#36), Milan Garrett (#35), Dwayne Leik (#81), Rick Ware (#51), Bill Sedgwick (#44)

Kroger 225 

The Kroger 225 was held October 8 at Louisville Motor Speedway. Jimmy Hensley won the pole.

Top Ten Results

3-Jay Sauter
2-Mike Wallace
43-Jimmy Hensley
98-Kevin Harvick
24-Jack Sprague
16-Ron Hornaday Jr.
14-Rick Crawford
1-Dennis Setzer
66-Mike Stefanik
18Joe Ruttman

Failed to qualify Frank Kimmel (#69), Ryan McGlynn (#00), Wayne Edwards (#77), Martin Truex (#68), Tom Powers (#5), Randy Briggs (#53), Phil Bonifield (#23), Scotty Sands (#47), Jerry Kobza (#11), Rick McCray (#42)

O'Reilly 300 

The O'Reilly 300 was held October 15 at Texas Motor Speedway. Jay Sauter won the pole.

Top Ten Results

3-Jay Sauter
50-Greg Biffle
1-Dennis Setzer
2-Mike Wallace
25-Randy Tolsma
88-Terry Cook
18-Joe Ruttman
60-Andy Houston
29-Bob Keselowski
16-Ron Hornaday Jr.

Failed to qualify: Jay Stewart (#33), Tommy Croft (#71), Rick Ware (#51), Rick McCray (#23), Ross Thompson (#92)

NAPA Auto Parts 200 

The NAPA Auto Parts 200 was held October 30 at California Speedway. Andy Houston won the pole.

Top Ten Results

24-Jack Sprague
18-Joe Ruttman
86-Stacy Compton
04-Bobby Hamilton
99-Mike Bliss
16-Ron Hornaday Jr.
50-Greg Biffle
43-Jimmy Hensley
66-Mike Stefanik

Failed to qualify: Ross Thompson (#92), Tom Powers (#5), Milan Garrett (#85), Mark Gibson (#59)

Final points standings 

Jack Sprague – 3747
Greg Biffle – 3739
Dennis Setzer – 3639
Stacy Compton – 3623
Jay Sauter – 3543
Mike Wallace – 3494
Ron Hornaday Jr. – 3488
Andy Houston – 3359
Mike Bliss – 3294
Jimmy Hensley – 3280
Randy Tolsma – 3173
Kevin Harvick – 3139
Mike Stefanik – 3074
Rick Crawford – 3018
Terry Cook – 2838
Kevin Cywinski – 2777
Ron Barfield Jr. – 2743
Scott Hansen – 2719
Rob Morgan – 2458
Lance Norick – 2313
Joe Ruttman – 2275
David Starr – 2132
Marty Houston – 1958
Lonnie Rush Jr. – 1408
Tim Steele – 1385
Bryan Reffner – 1274
Rick McCray – 1254
Butch Miller – 1188
Ryan McGlynn – 1089
Randy Renfrow – 1055
Phil Bonifield – 972
B. A. Wilson – 796
Rick Carelli – 739
Boris Said – 725
Ron Fellows – 578
Bobby Hamilton – 539
Ronnie Hornaday – 534
Bob Keselowski – 507
Ross Thompson – 480
Randy MacDonald – 470
Brad Bennett – 464
Jamie McMurray – 464
Stan Boyd – 452
Michael Dokken – 405
Brian Sockwell – 380
Tom Hubert – 373
Jerry Glanville – 352
Ronnie Newman – 332
Ernie Cope – 328
Shane Jenkins – 314

Rookie of the Year 

Mike Stefanik, driving in the series full-time in the #66 Phelon Motorsports car after having won the series championship in both the Busch North Series and the Featherlite Modified Series in the previous two seasons, managed to get nine top-tens en route to winning Rookie of the Year honors. Runner-up Scott Hansen had three top-tens in a Ken Schrader-owned truck, while David Starr drove 24 races for various owners. Marty Houston, Phil Bonifield, Ryan McGlynn, and former ARCA champion Tim Steele ran limited schedules during the season. Nipper Alsup, Ernie Cope, Mike Clark, and Randy Nelson all failed to meet the minimum requirements to contend for the top Rookie honors.

See also
1999 NASCAR Winston Cup Series
1999 NASCAR Busch Series

External links 
Craftsman Truck Series Standings and Statistics for 1999

NASCAR Truck Series seasons